A Gift of Love: Sifar is a Hindi film, based on The Gift of the Magi by O Henry. Directed by Dhruv Sachdev and produced by Zero Begins Films in association with PvR Pictures. SIFAR went on to bag 30 awards in the festival circuit with 15 Best Picture Awards, 9 Best Director Awards and 3 Best Actress Awards.

Cast 

 Sudha Chandran
 Mushtaq Khan
 Anang Desai
 Kanikka Kapur
 Varun Narula
 Sanjay Deyali

Plot 
Ayesha is an author, having a dark past. She is in discussion with her therapist – Dr Roy who is curious to know more about Ayesha’s past. During one of the therapy sessions, Ayesha agrees and narrates the love story of a gangster and a courtesan.

Soundtrack 

 
The soundtrack of A Gift of Love: Sifar consists of two songs both composed, programmed and sung by Anurag Mohn, the lyrics of which have been written by Shraddha Bhilave, Puneet Arjun Rai and Anurag Mohn.

Awards and recognition 

 Best Indie Feature at Los Angeles Film Awards 
 Outstanding Achievement Award at Berlin Flash Film Festival
Best Feature of the month at CKF International Film Festival May 2019
Outstanding Achievement Award at Calcutta International Cult Film Festival August 2019
Best Debut Filmmaker at Cult Critic The Film Magazine May 2019
Outstanding Achievement Award at MWIFF Mahul Woods International Film Festival May 2019
Best Debut Filmmaker at ’Age d’Or International Art-house Film Festival (LIAFF) May 2019
Best Producer at Gold Movie Awards June 2019
Feature Film at Miami Independent Film Festival June 2019

References

External links

2019 films
2010s Hindi-language films